Damián Alcázar (born 8 January, 1953) is a Mexican actor and politician, who is best known outside of Mexico as Lord Sopespian in The Chronicles of Narnia: Prince Caspian. He was a deputy in the Constituent Assembly of Mexico City from the MORENA political party.

Career
Damián Alcázar studied acting first at the National Institute of Fine Arts and at the Theatrical Experimentation Center, then continued at the Faculty of Theater of the Veracruz University, where in later years he would work as a teacher.

He served as an actor for eight years in two theatre companies, alongside the most prestigious directors in Mexico. Notably under the direction of George Labaudan, he appeared on Jean Genet's play, The Balcony.

He has appeared in six foreign films and more than twenty-eight Mexican films. He was awarded the Ariel for Best Actor in 1999 and in 2004, for the films Under California: The Time Limit, by Carlos Bolado, and Crónicas, by Sebastián Cordero. He also won the prize for Best Actor at the Festival of Valladolid in Spain, for the latter.

He received the Ariel Award for Best Supporting Actor for El anzuelo, by Ernesto Rimoch; for Lolo, by Francisco Athié; and for Carlos Carrera's successful film, The Crime of Padre Amaro. Alcázar has been nominated to receive this same award four other times. He won the award for Best Actor at the Cartagena Film Festival in Colombia for the film Two Crimes, by Roberto Sneider.

He has also worked on telenovelas, the most recent one being Secretos del corazón, produced by Epigmenio Ibarra for TV Azteca.

In April 2013 he was awarded the Honor Prize of the Latin American Film Show of Lleida with José Coronado.

In June 2016 he was elected as deputy by the political party MORENA in the Constituent Assembly of Mexico City, but left the position in January 2017 after being absent for three months.

Filmography

Film

Television

References

External links

Ariel Award winners
Best Actor Ariel Award winners
20th-century Mexican male actors
Mexican male film actors
Mexican male telenovela actors
21st-century Mexican male actors
1953 births
Living people
People from Jiquilpan, Michoacán
Male actors from Michoacán
Members of the Constituent Assembly of Mexico City
Universidad Veracruzana alumni
21st-century Mexican politicians